Kirby Krackle (also known as Kirby Dots) is an artistic convention in superhero and science fiction comic books and similar illustrations, in which a field of black is used to represent negative space around unspecified kinds of energy. Kirby Krackles are typically used in illustrations of explosions, smoke, the blasts from ray guns, "cosmic" energy, and outer space phenomena.

History

The effect is named after Jack Kirby, the influential comic book artist who created this stylistic device. While the Kirby Krackle in its mature form first appeared in Kirby's work during 1965–1966 (in Fantastic Four and Thor), comics historian Harry Mendryk (of the Jack Kirby Museum & Research Center) has traced the earliest version of the stylistic device as far back as 1940 to Jack Kirby and Joe Simon's Blue Bolt #5. As Joe Simon was the inker on that comic, he may have been partially responsible for look of the proto-Kirby Krackle. Examples of a transitional form of the Kirby Krackle appear in two of Kirby's stories from the late 1950s: The Man Who Collected Planets from 1957 (pencils and inks by Kirby) and The Negative Man from 1959 (inks attributed to Marvin Stein). The effects were used during the transformation sequences in Ben 10 (2005) and Ben 10 Omniverse (2012)

Kirby Krackle is incorporated into the design of the Guardians of the Galaxy – Mission: Breakout! attraction in Avengers Campus at Disney California Adventure. and Moon Girl and Devil Dinosaur

Analysis
Philosophy professor and author Jeffrey J. Kripal wrote:

References

External links
Kirby Krackles Brushes for  Illustrator
Kirby Krackles Brushes for Photoshop

Comics terminology
Artistic techniques
Jack Kirby